P. americana  may refer to:

 Paradelphomyia americana, a crane fly species in the genus Paradelphomyia
 Periplaneta americana, the American cockroach, palmetto bug or waterbug
 Persea americana, the avocado, aguacate, palta, butter pear or alligator pear tree
 Pilularia americana, the American pillwort, an aquatic fern species
 Prunus americana, a species of plum tree
 Phytolacca americana, pokeweed, a poisonous weed native to the United States of America, with invasions into Europe and Japan

See also
 Americana (disambiguation)